This is a list of towns of Luxembourg by population.  Only towns with populations of over 1,000 are included.

References

See also
 List of communes of Luxembourg by population
 List of quarters of Luxembourg City by population

 Population
Towns by population